Pogorzelce  is a village in the administrative district of Gmina Białowieża, within Hajnówka County, Podlaskie Voivodeship, in north-eastern Poland, close to the border with Belarus. It lies 1 km west of the river Narewka.

References

Pogorzelce
Białowieża Forest